The Tenna is a river in the Marche region of Italy. Its source is in the Sibillini Mountains in the province of Fermo near the border with the province of Macerata. It flows northeast through the mountains near Montefortino and Amandola before forming the border between the provinces of Fermo and Macerata. The river enters the province of Fermo near Servigliano and continues flowing northeast past Grottazzolina and Montegiorgio. Finally, the river enters the Adriatic Sea near Sant'Elpidio a Mare and Porto Sant'Elpidio.

References

Rivers of the Province of Fermo
Rivers of the Province of Macerata
Rivers of Italy
Adriatic Italian coast basins